Henshin may refer to:

Literature
 Metamorphosis (manga) (へんしん), a 2013-2016 Japanese pornographic comic book by ShindoL
 Henshin (manga), a 2013 Japanese comic book by Ken Niimura

Chapters
 "Henshin" (manga serial chapter), chapter of Japanese comic book Kamen Rider Spirits
 "Henshin!"

Television and film
 Henshin (TV series), a 1993 Japanese TV show by screenwriter Miyuki Miyabe
 Henshin (TV series), a 2014 Japanese TV drama starring Ryūnosuke Kamiki
 "Henshin" (video), a 2006 Japanese video directed by Wataru Takeishi
 Henshin (film), a 2008 3d animated film at the Nicktoons Film Festival

Episodes
 "Henshin" (TV episode), 2010 episode 15 of animation Amagami SS; see List of Amagami SS episodes
 "Henshin!" (TV episode), 2015 season 7 episode 222 of animation Fairy Tail; 

Music
 "Henshin" (album), a 2012 album by 'Chatmonchy'

Songs
 "Henshin" (song), a 2014 song by 'Bakudan Johnny' off the album Hajimete no Bakudan Johnny
 "Henshin (Reborn)", a 1991 song by 'Buck-Tick' off the album Kurutta Taiyou
 "Henshin!?"

Characters
 Henshin Heroine, a character type from various magical girl animanga cartoons and comics
 Henshin Hero, a character type from various super sentai tokusatsu TV shows
 Rider Henshin, a character from Kamen Rider
 Henshin V3, a character from Kamen Rider V3
 Sky Henshin, a character from  Kamen Rider (1979 TV series)

Other uses
 Henshin (software), a software application package for software engineering that performs graph rewriting
 Henshin, a Japanese fusion restaurant in Gama Tower, Jakarta, Indonesia
 henshin, a tourist activity to transform into an ersatz maiko or geisha

See also